The Portland Queer Comedy Festival is an annual five-day comedy festival that takes place in Portland, Oregon. Multiple venues are used throughout the festival's stretch, and upwards of 50 comedians perform. Comics such as Bruce Villanch, Irene Tu, Mary Jane French, Danielle Radford, Guy Branum, Jeffery Jay, Corina Lucas, Scott Thompson, and James Adomian have participated. Drag queens such as Valerie DeVille and Bolivia Carmicheals have hosted bingo games as part of the fest.

Background
The festival was founded in 2017 by comedian Belinda Carroll and entertainment venue owner Andy Barrett, both queer activists.

The fest includes traditional standup showcases, industry panels, podcasts, drag bingo, parody game shows, and strip shows.

References

LGBT events in Oregon
Festivals in Portland, Oregon
LGBT festivals in the United States